Edward Wojtas (1 March 1955 in Wólka Modrzejowa – 10 April 2010) was a member of the Polish Sejm and a politician active in the Polish People's Party (PSL).

He was listed on the flight manifest of the Tupolev Tu-154 of the 36th Special Aviation Regiment carrying the President of Poland Lech Kaczyński which crashed near Smolensk-North airport near Pechersk near Smolensk, Russia, on 10 April 2010, killing all aboard.

Wojtas was awarded the Gold Cross of Merit and on 16 April 2010 he was also awarded, posthumously, the Commander's Cross of the Order of Polonia Restituta.

References

1955 births
2010 deaths
People from Lipsko County
Victims of the Smolensk air disaster
Commanders of the Order of Polonia Restituta
Recipients of the Gold Cross of Merit (Poland)
Members of the Polish Sejm 2007–2011
Voivodeship marshals of Poland
Lublin Voivodeship